Dumy  is a village in the administrative district of Gmina Wielkie Oczy, within Lubaczów County, Podkarpackie Voivodeship, in south-eastern Poland, close to the border with Ukraine.

References

Dumy